The Chicago, Kansas and Nebraska Railway (originally Railroad) was formed in 1885 with Marcus Low, a former attorney for the Chicago, Rock Island and Pacific Railroad, as its president.  The CRI&P advanced the CK&N about twenty-five million dollars to begin construction in exchange for nearly all of the CK&N's stock.  Essentially, this made the CRI&P the owner of the CK&N from the very beginning.  The CK&N had put down about 1388 miles of track, mostly in Kansas, Nebraska, Colorado and Indian Territory, but in 1889 it failed to make its interest payment to the CRI&P.  The CRI&P started foreclosure proceedings on the CK&N, eventually fully taking over by June 17, 1891.

Construction Record 
 1886: Elwood KS - Horton KS, Beatrice NE - Fairbury NE
 1887: Horton KS - Beatrice NE, Horton KS - Topeka KS - Herington KS - Caldwell KS, Herington KS - Salina KS, Fairbury KS - Belleville KS - Mankato KS, Belleville KS - MacFarland KS 
 1888: Mankato KS - Goodland KS - Limon CO - Colorado Springs CO, Herington KS - Liberal KS, purchased Dodge City KS - Bucklin KS
 1889: Caldwell KS - El Reno IT
 1890: El Reno IT - Minco IT

References

Defunct Missouri railroads
Defunct Kansas railroads
Defunct Nebraska railroads
Defunct Oklahoma railroads
Defunct Colorado railroads
Predecessors of the Chicago, Rock Island and Pacific Railroad
Railway companies established in 1886
Railway companies disestablished in 1891